Royal Inland Hospital is a medical facility located in Kamloops, British Columbia serving a catchment area of 225,000 km2.

About
Interior Health Authority is responsible for the operations of the hospital. It is the publicly funded healthcare provider in the Southern Interior region of the Province.

Royal Inland Hospital (RIH) is a 254-bed tertiary acute care hospital located in Kamloops, BC. It is the only tertiary acute care facility in the Thompson Cariboo Shuswap area and it is the one of only two tertiary care centres in Interior Health (IHA). As the primary referral centre for the area, it offers a broad range of medical and surgical services. RIH emergency department is recognized for its ability to respond to a number of large and complex traumas annually and for its efficiency in  serving needs and demands of a large geographic area. The newest venture in complex acute care is a major capital project for a patient care tower to respond to the service requirements.

Hillside Centre, SHCPR and provincial Tertiary Neuropsychiatry Programs provides intensive mental health services and recovery oriented rehabilitation for patients from throughout the southern interior of BC, working collaboratively with community partners throughout the region as a part of the tertiary mental health system for the Interior Health Authority. Care is provided by a multidisciplinary team in a residential setting providing longer term stabilization and recovery oriented care for its clients. South Hills has 40 beds, with each of two psychiatrists and social workers covering 20 of those beds. The tertiary psychiatric team in Kamloops consists of 7 psychiatrists who collaborates as necessary for the quality of services. They extend their services in Community Mental Health such as Geriatric and Addictions work.

Services
Diagnostic imaging (CT, MRI and Ultrasound)
Emergency
Inpatient Care (Family Medicine, Internal Medicine, Neurology, Palliative Care, Pediatrics)
Psychiatry / Mental health
Secondary and Tertiary Prevention (Diabetes Clinic)
Surgery (General, Neurosurgery, Orthopedics, Plastics, Urology, Vascular)

Statistics
In the 2012 year 57,000 patients were assessed in the emergency department.

Educational services
The hospital serves as a training centre for multiple professions. Nursing students from Thompson Rivers University train at this site. The hospital serves as a site for rotating pharmacy residents.  Starting 2014 the hospital will serve as a hub for a family medicine residency training program.

History
1885 - Constructed with 12 beds
1891 - Renovated to 15 beds
1886 - Woman's ward
1905 - Trafalgar Wing added
1910 - Opening of Columbia Street  128 bed hospital
1925 - Addition of medical laboratory
1947 - West Wing and East Wing added
1965 - Nine story tower built
1981 - North tower built
1988 - West tower built
2006 - Expansion of ER, radiology, orthopedic clinic and preadmission clinic.
2006 - Hillside Psychiatric Centre opened

Future developments
In 2012 it was announced that the hospital would receive a major expansion including a clinical services building and additional parking.

References 

Buildings and structures in Kamloops
Hospitals in British Columbia
Heliports in Canada